This List of University of Maryland, Baltimore County Honorary Degree Recipients includes those persons who have been recognized by UMBC for outstanding achievements in their fields that reflect the ideals and uphold the purposes of the university, and to whom the university faculty has voted to award honorary degrees in recognition of such attainments. Many of the individuals below are also speakers during the university's commencement ceremonies.

The following are recipients of honorary degrees from the University of Maryland, Baltimore County, beginning in 1970:

Honorary degree recipients, 1970–1979

1970
  	Howard K. Smith, Humane Letters

1971
  	Patricia Roberts Harris, Laws

1972
  	King V. Cheek, Laws

1973
  	B.F. Skinner, Humane Letters

1974
  	Malcolm Charles Moos, Laws

1975
  	Alice Rivlin, Laws

1976
  	James S. Ackerman, Humane Letters

1977
  	Louis Kaplan, Letters
  	Richard Lattimore, Humane Letters
  	Albert Sabin, Science

1978
  	John Barademas, Laws
  	Halden Keffer Hartline, Science
  	Ola Belle Reed, Humane Letters

1979
  	Peter Gay, Letters
  	C.L.R. James, Humane Letters

Honorary degree recipients, 1980–1989

1980
  	Ernst Boyer, Public Service
  	Lucille Clifton, Humane Letters
  	Donald Henderson, Science

1981
  	Sterling A. Brown, Humanities
  	Jon Franklin, Humane Letters

1982
  	Tom L. Freudenheim, Fine Arts
  	John M. Sheehan, Public Service
  	Maxim Shostakovich, Fine Arts
  	Rosalyn Sussman Yalow, Science

1983
  	Donald D. Brown, Science
  	John L. Crew, Sr., Public Service
  	Lotte Jacobi, Fine Arts
  	Albin Owings Kuhn, Public Service
  	William Arthur Lewis, Laws

1984
  	Robert Duncan, Fine Arts
  	Stephan Jay Gould, Science
  	Raymond V. Haysbert, Public Service
  	Roger Rosenblatt, Humane Letters

1985
  	Robert M. Ball, Public Administration
  	Dorothy Hill, Humanities
  	Alice Gwathney Pinderhughes, Public Service
  	Maxine Singer, Science
  	Chia Chen Tan, Science

1986
  	John G. St.Clair Drake, Letters
  	Reg Murphy, Public Service
  	Pauline Oliveros, Music
  	Rudolph G. Penner, Public Service
  	James P. Grant, Public Service
  	Walter Rosenblum, Fine Arts

1987
  	LaSalle D. Leffall, Jr., Science
  	Charles McC, Mathias, Jr., Science

1988
  	Lyn P. Meyerhoff, Fine Arts
  	Benjamin Arthur Quarles, Humane Letters
  	Walter Sondheim, Jr., Public Service
  	Hiltgunt Zassenhaus, Humane Letters

1989
  	Paul Duke, Laws
  	Frances Morton Froelicher, Public Services
  	Kou-ting Li, Science
  	Max Roach, Music

Honorary degree recipients, 1990–1999

1990
  	Taylor Branch, Humane Letters
  	Eli Jacobs, Humane Letters
  	Gwendolyn King, Public Service

1991
  	Robert Coles, Humane Letters
  	Ralph Gibson, Fine Arts
  	Arthur Kornberg, Science
  	Enolia McMillan, Public Service

1992
  	Henry Cisneros, Public Service
  	Nancy Graves, Fine Arts
  	Emmett Paige, Jr., Laws

1993
  	R. Charles Avara, Public Service
  	Perter Lax, Science
  	Robert E. Meyerhoff, Humane Letters
  	Barbara Mikulski, Letters

1994
  	Shirley Chater, Humane Letters
  	Louis Goldstein, Humane Letters
  	William Hackerman, Engineering
  	William C. Richardson, Humane Letters
  	Nelson John Sabatini, Public Service
  	William Donald Schaefer, Laws
  	Lisbeth Bamberger Schoor, Humane Letters
  	Carole Simpson, Humane Letters
  	Harold Wolff, Laws

1995
  	Edward Ray McCracken, Science
  	Otto Piene, Fine Arts
  	Harold Eliot Varmus, Science

1996
  	Stephen M. Case, Science
  	Purnell W. Choppin, Science
  	J. Robert Kerrey, Public Service

1997
  	Carl Djerassi, Science
  	John H. Gibbons, Science
  	Ira Magaziner, Public Administration
  	Donna Shalala, Public Service

1998
  	Daniel Saul Goldin, Science

1999
  	Rita Rossi Colwell, Science
  	John C. Erickson, Public Service
  	Nancy Erickson, Public Service
  	Darielle Dunn Lineman, Arts
  	Earl Louise Linehan, Arts
  	Eunice Kennedy Shriver, Public Service
  	Sargent Shriver, Public Service

Honorary degree recipients, 2000–2009

2000
 Thomas R. Chech, Science
  Robert W. Deutsch, Science
 Mayo Shattuck III, Public Service

2001
 Marian Wright Edelman, Public Service
 Hon. Barbara Hoffman, Public Service
 Bob Kahn, Science
 Pete Rawlings, Public Service

2004
 William Foege, Science
 Ursula Burns, Engineering
 William A. Haseltine, Science

2005
 Mary Ann E. Mears, Fine Arts

2006
 Soloman H. Snyder, Science
 Richard Broadhead, Humane Letters
 Alan Lightman, Humanities

2007
 Betsy and George Sherman, Public Service
 Judith Rodin, Humane Letters
 William Brody, Science

2008
 Virginia Dresher, Public Service
 Paul Sarbanes, Public Service
 Franco Einaudi, Science
 Claude Steele, Science

2009
 Thomas Friedman, Humane Letters
 Shirley M. Tilghman, Science
 Peter Agre, Science
 Karen Davis, Public Service

Honorary degree recipients, 2010-present

2010
 G. Wayne Clough, Science

2011
 Rodney C. Adkins, Science
 Jeffrey R. Immelt, Public Service
 Marie M. Klawe, Public Service

2014
 Mary Schmidt Campbell, Fine Arts
2015
 Andrea Mitchell, Public Service

References

University of Maryland, Baltimore County
Baltimore-related lists